Joe Bradshaw (1884 – date unknown) was an English football player and manager.

Career

Playing career
As a player, he started out at Woolwich Polytechnic before turning professional at Woolwich Arsenal, where his father Harry Bradshaw, was manager; however he never made a first-team appearance. After his father left to manage Fulham in 1904, Bradshaw had brief spells at West Norwood and Southampton before rejoining his father at his new club; he played as an outside right for Fulham in a five-year spell that saw the club win the Southern League title twice and join the Football League in 1907. He then had stints at Chelsea, Queens Park Rangers and Southend United. His brother, William, also played for Woolwich Arsenal and Fulham under their father.

Coaching career
He eventually became player-manager of Southend United in 1912 (from a part-time basis only in 1913), winning promotion to the Southern League First Division, and seeing the club through World War I. In 1919 he moved to Swansea Town and spent seven years there, winning the Third Division South title in 1924–1925, before being tempted by one of his former clubs; he moved back to Fulham, following in the footsteps of his father. His reign at Fulham was not auspicious - overseeing relegation to the Third Division South and failing to regain promotion. In 1929 he moved to Bristol City, whom he managed for three years.

References

1884 births
Year of death missing
Footballers from Burnley
English footballers
Southampton F.C. players
Arsenal F.C. players
Fulham F.C. players
Chelsea F.C. players
Queens Park Rangers F.C. players
Southend United F.C. players
English football managers
Southend United F.C. managers
Swansea City A.F.C. managers
Fulham F.C. managers
Bristol City F.C. managers
Woolwich Polytechnic F.C. players
West Norwood F.C. players
Association football outside forwards